Lawrence or Laurence Bell may refer to:

Lawrence Dale Bell (1894–1956), American industrialist and founder of Bell Aircraft Corporation
Lawrence Bell (footballer) (1875–1955), Scottish football player
Lawrence Bell (politician) in 1973 Manitoba general election
Laurence Bell, founder of Domino Recording Company

See also
Larry Bell (disambiguation)
Laurie Bell (disambiguation)